A retroflex ( or ), apico-domal, or cacuminal consonant is a coronal consonant where the tongue has a flat, concave, or even curled shape, and is articulated between the alveolar ridge and the hard palate. They are sometimes referred to as cerebral consonants—especially in Indology.

The Latin-derived word retroflex means "bent back"; some retroflex consonants are pronounced with the tongue fully curled back so that articulation involves the underside of the tongue tip (subapical). These sounds are sometimes described as "true" retroflex consonants. However, retroflexes are commonly taken to include other consonants having a similar place of articulation without such extreme curling of the tongue; these may be articulated with the tongue tip (apical) or the tongue blade (laminal).

Types
Retroflex consonants, like other coronal consonants, come in several varieties, depending on the shape of the tongue. The tongue may be either flat or concave, or even with the tip curled back. The point of contact on the tongue may be with the tip, with the blade, or with the underside of the tongue.  The point of contact on the roof of the mouth may be with the alveolar ridge, the area behind the alveolar ridge, or the hard palate.  Finally, both sibilant ( or ) and nonsibilant consonants can have a retroflex articulation.

The greatest variety of combinations occurs with sibilants, because for them, small changes in tongue shape and position cause significant changes in the resulting sound. Retroflex sounds generally have a duller, lower-pitched sound than other alveolar or postalveolar consonants, especially the  sibilants. The farther back the point of contact with the roof of the mouth, the more concave is the shape of the tongue, and the duller (lower pitched) is the sound, with subapical consonants being the most extreme.

The main combinations normally observed are:
Laminal post-alveolar, with a flat tongue. These occur, for example, in Polish cz, sz, ż (rz), dż .
Apical post-alveolar, with a somewhat concave tongue.  These occur, for example, in Mandarin zh, ch, sh, r, Hindi and other Indo-Aryan languages.
Subapical palatal, with a highly concave tongue, which occur particularly in the Dravidian languages and some Indo-Aryan languages. They are the dullest and lowest-pitched type and, after a vowel, often add strong r-coloring to the vowel and sound as if an American English r occurred between the vowel and consonant. They are not a place of articulation, as the IPA chart implies, but a shape of the tongue analogous to laminal and apical.

Subapical sounds are sometimes called "true retroflex" because of the curled-back shape of the tongue, and the other sounds sometimes go by other names. For example, Ladefoged and Maddieson prefer to call the laminal post-alveolar sounds "flat post-alveolar".

Other sounds
Retroflex sounds must be distinguished from other consonants made in the same parts of the mouth:
the palato-alveolar consonants (e.g.), such as the sh, ch and zh occurring in English words like ship, chip and vision
the alveolo-palatal consonants (e.g.), such as the j, q and  x occurring in Mandarin Chinese
the dorsal palatal consonants (e.g.), such as the ch  in German ich or the ñ  in Spanish año
the grooved alveolar consonants (e.g.), such as the s and z occurring in English words like sip and zip

The first three types of sounds above have a convex tongue shape, which gives them an additional secondary articulation of palatalization.  The last type has a groove running down the center line of the tongue, which gives it a strong hissing quality.  The retroflex sounds, however, have a flat or concave shape, with no associated palatalization, and no groove running down the tongue.  The term "retroflex", in fact, literally means "bent back" (concave), although consonants with a flat tongue shape are commonly considered retroflex as well.

The velar bunched approximant found in northern varieties of Dutch and some varieties of American English is acoustically similar to the retroflex approximant. It is articulated with the body of the tongue bunched up at the velum.

Transcription

IPA transcription
In the International Phonetic Alphabet, the symbols for retroflex consonants are typically the same as for the alveolar consonants, but with the addition of a right-facing hook to the bottom of the symbol.

Retroflex consonants are transcribed in the International Phonetic Alphabet as follows:

Other conventions
Some linguists restrict these symbols for consonants with subapical palatal articulation, in which the tongue is curled back and contacts the hard palate, and use the alveolar symbols with the obsolete IPA underdot symbol for an apical post-alveolar articulation: , and use  for laminal retroflex, as in Polish and Russian.

Consonants with more forward articulation, in which the tongue touches the alveolar or postalveolar region rather than the hard palate, can be indicated with the retracted diacritic (minus sign below).

Occurrence
Although data are not precise, about 20 percent of the world's languages contain retroflex consonants of one sort or another. About half of these possess only retroflex continuants, with most of the rest having both stops and continuants.

Retroflex consonants are concentrated in the Indian subcontinent, particularly in the Indo-Aryan and Dravidian languages, but are found in other languages of the region as well, such as the Munda languages and Burushaski. 

The Nuristani languages of eastern Afghanistan also have retroflex consonants. Among Eastern Iranian languages, they are common in Pashto, Wakhi, Sanglechi-Ishkashimi, and Munji-Yidgha. They also occur in some other Asian languages such as Mandarin Chinese, Javanese and Vietnamese. In West Asia, the Shihhi Arabic variety also has retroflex approximants.

The other major concentration is in the indigenous languages of Australia and the Western Pacific (notably New Caledonia). Here, most languages have retroflex plosives, nasal and approximants.

Retroflex consonants are relatively rare in the European languages but occur in such languages as Swedish and Norwegian in Northern Europe, some Romance languages of Southern Europe (Sardinian, Sicilian, including Calabrian and Salentino, some Italian dialects such as Lunigianese in Italy, and some Asturian dialects in Spain), and (sibilants only) Faroese and several Slavic languages (Polish, Russian, Serbo-Croatian, Slovak and Sorbian). That is sometimes done for several consonants in a row after an r: Hornstull is pronounced ).

The retroflex approximant  is in free variation with the postalveolar approximant  in many dialects of American English, particularly in the Midwestern United States. Polish and Russian possess retroflex sibilants, but no stops or liquids at this place of articulation.

Retroflex consonants are largely absent from indigenous languages of the Americas with the exception of the extreme south of South America, an area in the Southwestern United States as in Hopi and O'odham, and in Alaska and the Yukon Territory as in the Athabaskan languages Gwich’in and Hän. In African languages retroflex consonants are also rare but reportedly occur in a few Nilo-Saharan languages, as well as in the Bantu language Makhuwa and some other varieties. In southwest Ethiopia, phonemically distinctive retroflex consonants are found in Bench and Sheko, two contiguous, but not closely related, Omotic languages.

There are several retroflex consonants that are implied by the International Phonetic Association. (See Latin Extended-F.) The lateral fricatives are explicitly provided for by extIPA. 

Most of these sounds are not common, but they all occur. For example, the Iwaidja language of northern Australia has a retroflex lateral flap  as well as a retroflex tap  and retroflex lateral approximant ; and the Dravidian language Toda has a subapical retroflex lateral fricative  and a retroflexed trill . The Ngad'a language of Flores has been reported to have a retroflex implosive . Subapical retroflex clicks occur in Central !Kung, and possibly in Damin.

Most languages with retroflex sounds typically have only one retroflex sound with a given manner of articulation. An exception, however, is the Toda language, with a two-way distinction among retroflex sibilants between apical (post)alveolar and subapical palatal.

See also
 Hush consonant
 List of phonetics topics
 Place of articulation
 Retroflex approximant

References

External links
Silke Hamann's dissertation on retroflex consonants 
Retroflex Consonant Harmony in South Asia by Paul Arsenault

Place of articulation